John Yeon (October 29, 1910 – March 13, 1994) was an American architect in Portland, Oregon, in the mid-twentieth century.  He is regarded as one of the early practitioners of the Northwest Regional style of Modernism. Largely self-taught, Yeon’s wide ranging activities encompassed planning, conservation, historic preservation, art collecting, and urban activism. He was a connoisseur of objets d’art as well as landscapes, and one of Oregon’s most gifted architectural designers, even while his output was limited.

The family name is pronounced "yee-on", not "yawn".

Early life
John Yeon was born in Portland on October 29, 1910, the son of John B. Yeon and Elizabeth Mock Yeon. The elder was a lumber baron and construction manager who oversaw the building of the Columbia River Highway, and developer of Portland's Yeon Building. The younger Yeon was largely raised in Portland and attended Allen Preparatory School in that city. But he also attended the Moran School in Washington State, where he did some of his earliest design work.  After he completed high school, he left for California to attend Stanford University. An autodidact and polymath, Yeon attended the college for just a single semester before leaving and never became a licensed architect.

Architecture

His first built work–the 1937 Watzek House–was included in a 1939 publication and accompanying exhibition by the Museum of Modern Art. His most notable works include the aforementioned Aubrey R. Watzek House (1937) and the Portland Visitors Information Center (1949), both of which were featured in exhibits at the Museum of Modern Art in New York City. The Watzek house is listed on the National Register of Historic Places. The John Yeon Speculative House (1939), one of the best-preserved of his nine "speculative house" series, was added to the National Register of Historic Places in August 2007.  Yeon also designed museum exhibitions, including those for the Portland Art Museum, Nelson-Atkins Museum of Art, Asian Art Museum in San Francisco, and the Palace of the Legion of Honor.

In 1956, Yeon was awarded the Brunner Prize for architecture by the National Institute of Arts. The University of Oregon awarded him a Distinguished Service Award in 1977, and Lewis & Clark College gave him its annual Aubrey Watzek Award in 1980.

John Yeon died in Portland on Sunday, March 13, 1994, of congestive heart failure. He was interred at the Portland Memorial Mausoleum.

The John Yeon Center 
A gift on behalf of the estate of John Yeon was made to the University of Oregon School of Architecture and Allied Arts, which established the John Yeon Center for Architecture and the John Yeon Preserve for Landscape Studies.  The John Yeon Center has also sponsored a John Yeon Lecture Series. Part of the University of Oregon’s School of Architecture and Allied Arts, the Center manages and programs three properties designed by Yeon: the Watzek House (1937), a National Historic Landmark; the Cottrell House (1952), and the Shire, a 75-acre park in the Columbia River Gorge.

Retrospective 
Quest for Beauty: The Architecture, Landscapes, and Collections of John Yeon, a major retrospective of Yeon's work, opened at the Portland Art Museum on May 13 and ran through September 3, 2017. The exhibit was designed by Lever Architecture of Portland, OR. Two monographs, John Yeon: Architecture and John Yeon: Landscape, were published by Andrea Monfried Editions in conjunction with the exhibition. Illustrated with drawings, plans and photographs, the books include essays by the director of the John Yeon Center, Randy Gragg, and other contributors, who explore his approach and contextualize his influence.

Further reading 
Bosker, Gideon, and Lena Lencek.  Frozen Music: A History of Portland Architecture.  Portland: Oregon Historical Society, 1985.
Placzek, Adolf K., ed.  "Yeon, John."  Macmillan Encyclopedia of Architects.  New York: Free Press, 1982.
Randy Gragg (Editor), Brian Ferriso (Foreword), Barry Bergdoll (Contributor), J. M. Cava (Contributor), Marc Treib (Contributor). John Yeon Architecture: Building in the Pacific Northwest. Andrea Monfried Editions, New York, June 2017 
Randy Gragg (Editor), Susan Seubert (Photographer), Bowen Blair (Contributor), Kenneth Helphand (Contributor) John Yeon Landscape: Design, Conservation, Activism. Andrea Monfried Editions, New York, June 2017
Marc Treib, John Yeon Modern Architecture and Conservation in the Pacific Northwest December 2016, Oro Editions

References

External links

John Yeon images in Building Oregon: Architecture of Oregon and the Pacific Northwest (from the University of Oregon Libraries)
New York Times obituary of Yeon
John Yeon Lecture Series from the University of Oregon School of Architecture & Allied Arts

Way, James. Works by John Yeon, the godfather of Pacific Northwest modernism, go on view at the Portland Art Museum. The Architect's Newspaper
Dundas, Zach. How Portland-Born Architect John Yeon Gave the Northwest Its Signature Style. Portland Monthly, May 2017
Lagdameo, Jennifer, Spotlight on John Yeon, Father of Northwest Regionalism, Dwell June 3, 2017
Eastman, Janet, Step into fabled modern architect John Yeon's nature-centric world: 'Quest for Beauty', The Oregonian May 2017
Vondersmith, Jason. Passion of a Modern Master: Yeon's Work Gets its Due. Portland Tribune, May 22, 2017.

1910 births
1994 deaths
Burials at Portland Memorial Mausoleum
Architects from Portland, Oregon
Modernist architects
20th-century American architects
Philanthropists from Oregon
American designers
20th-century American philanthropists